The 2018 Iranian Futsal 2nd Division (football is called futsal in Iran), was divided into three phases.  The league was composed of 34 teams divided into four divisions 6 teams and two divisions 5 teams; whose teams were divided geographically. Teams only played teams in their own division, once at home and once away for a total of 10 or 8 matches each.

Teams

Group 1

Group 2

Group 3

Group 4

Group 5

Group 6

Preliminary round

Group 1

Group 2

Group 3

Group 4

Group 5

Group 6

Second round

Group A

Group B

Group C

Group D

Main round 
Last updated: 10 January 2019

Group 1 (Arak)

Group B (Marzanabad)

See also 
 2017–18 Iranian Futsal Super League
 2017–18 Futsal 1st Division
 2017–18 Persian Gulf Cup
 2017–18 Azadegan League
 2017–18 Iran Football's 2nd Division
 2017–18 Iran Football's 3rd Division
 2017–18 Hazfi Cup

References 

Iran Futsal's 2nd Division seasons
3
3